Joseph Vincent Flynn (September 2, 1883 – February 6, 1940) of Brooklyn, New York was an American lawyer and politician who served two terms as a member of the United States House of Representatives from New York from 1915 to 1919. He was a Democrat.

Biography 
Flynn was born in Brooklyn, New York, on September 2, 1883. He attended public schools and the Boys High School of Brooklyn. He graduated from the College of the City of New York in 1904 and from the Brooklyn Law School of St. Lawrence University in 1906; was admitted to the bar in the latter year and commenced the practice of law in New York City.

Congress 
Flynn was elected as a Democrat to the Sixty-fourth and Sixty-fifth Congresses (March 4, 1915 – March 3, 1919). He was not a candidate for renomination in 1918. He resumed the practice of law in New York City. He was a delegate to the Democratic State conventions in 1925 and 1927. He resided in Brooklyn, New York, until his death there February 6, 1940 at the age of 56.

He is interred in Calvary Cemetery, Long Island City, New York.

References

External links

Joseph Vincent Flynn entry at The Political Graveyard

 

1883 births
1940 deaths
People from Brooklyn
Brooklyn Law School alumni
Burials at Calvary Cemetery (Queens)
New York (state) lawyers
New York University alumni
St. Lawrence University alumni
Democratic Party members of the United States House of Representatives from New York (state)
20th-century American politicians
Boys High School (Brooklyn) alumni
20th-century American lawyers